Charly Rössli (born 17 March 1961) is a retired Swiss football striker and later manager.

References

1961 births
Living people
Swiss men's footballers
FC Sion players
CS Chênois players
FC Bulle players
AC Bellinzona players
Association football forwards
Swiss Super League players
Swiss football managers
FC Sion managers
ES Sétif managers
Maghreb de Fès managers
Swiss expatriate football managers
Swiss expatriate sportspeople in Algeria
Swiss expatriate sportspeople in Morocco